The following are the squad lists for the countries that played in the 1959 South American Championship held in Argentina. The participating countries were Argentina, Bolivia, Brazil, Chile, Paraguay, Peru and Uruguay. 

The teams plays in a single round-robin tournament, earning two points for a win, one point for a draw, and zero points for a loss.

Argentina 
Head Coach:  Victorio Spinetto

Bolivia
Head Coach:  Vicente Arraya

Brazil
Head Coach:  Vicente Feola

Chile
Head Coach:  Fernando Riera

Paraguay 
Head Coach:  Aurelio González

Peru
Head Coach:  György Orth

Uruguay 
Head Coach:  Héctor Castro

References 

sq
Copa América squads